Shafiqul Islam (born 5 July 1997) is a Bangladeshi cricketer. He made his first-class debut for Rajshahi Division in the 2018–19 National Cricket League on 8 October 2018. He made his List A debut for the Bangladesh A cricket team against Afghanistan A on 24 July 2019. In August 2019, he was one of 35 cricketers named in a training camp ahead of Bangladesh's 2019–20 season. He made his Twenty20 debut on 30 November 2020, for Beximco Dhaka in the 2020–21 Bangabandhu T20 Cup.

In February 2021, he was selected in the Bangladesh Emerging squad for their home series against the Ireland Wolves.

References

External links
 

1997 births
Living people
Bangladeshi cricketers
Rajshahi Division cricketers
People from Bogra District
Rupganj Tigers Cricket Club cricketers